Alphen a/d Rijn railway station is a railway station in Alphen aan den Rijn, Netherlands.

History
The railway station was opened in 1878, as part of a railway connection between Leiden and Woerden. A connection between Alphen aan den Rijn and Uithoorn was opened in 1915.

The line was extended to Gouda in 1932, but the connection between Alphen aan den Rijn and Uithoorn was closed in 1936.

The railway station was renovated for the RijnGouweLijn from Gouda in 2004, involving the construction of an additional platform.

In 2007 a major redesign of the railway station and its surrounding area started. The original railway station building (built in 1878) was demolished to make room for a tunnel underneath the railway and a bike storage facility. The new tunnel links the old town centre with the new district "Kerk en Zanen", which used to be separated from the town centre by the railway. The tunnel and bike storage facility opened in mid 2010.

Train services
The following services call at Alphen a/d Rijn:

NS Intercity services Leiden - Alphen aan den Rijn - Woerden - Utrecht
R-net local services (Sprinter) Alphen aan den Rijn - Gouda

Bus services

 1 (Station - De Aarhof - Ridderhof - Haagwinde - Rijsenburg - Busstation Herenhof - Ijzerweg - Eisenhowerlaan - Station)
 2 (Station - Eisenhowerlaan - Ijzweg - Busstation Herenhof - Rijsenburg - Haagwinde - Ridderhof - De Aarhof - Station)
 3 (Station - Europalaan - Amerikaweg - Albert Einsteinweg - Ondernemingsweg - Station)
 4 (Station - Ondernemingsweg - Albert Einsteinweg - Amerikaweg - Europalaan - Station)
 147 (Station - De Aarhof - Rijnbrug - Aarlanderveen - Nieuwkoop - Zevenhoven - Nieuwveen - Vrouwenakker - De Kwakel - Uithoorn, Busstation)
 165 (Station - Hazerwoude Rijndijk - Hazerwoude - Benthuizen - Willem Dreeslaan RR - Palenstein RR - Zoetermeer, Centrum West RR)
 169 (Station - De Aarhof - Ridderhof - Rijnland Hospital - Koudekerk aan den Rijn - Hazerwoude Rijndijk - Zoeterwoude Rijndijk - Leiden, Centraal Station)
 182 (Station - Eisenhowerlaan - Ter Aar - Woubrugge - Hoogmade - Leiderdorp - Leiden, Centraal Station)
 249 (Station - Rijsenburg - Woubrugge - Hoogmade - Leiderdorp - Leiden)
 370 (Station - Eisenhowerlaan - De Hoek (Change for Hoofddorp) - Amsterdam Airport Schiphol)

External links
 NS website 
 Dutch Public Transport journey planner 
 Municipal plans for the development of the area around the railway station
 History of the railway line between Leiden and Woerden

Railway stations in South Holland
Railway stations opened in 1878
Alphen aan den Rijn
1878 establishments in the Netherlands
Railway stations in the Netherlands opened in the 19th century